HMS Pagham was one of 93 ships of the  of inshore minesweepers.

Their names were all chosen from villages ending in -ham. The minesweeper was named after Pagham in West Sussex.

In 1978 she was loaned to the Stranraer Sea Cadet Unit, and formally given to them on 1 May 1999. After the closure of the Stranraer Sea Cadet unit the MOD/SCC sold her for a nominal fee to a private owner who stripped her of reclaimable parts.

In March 2008 she lies part stripped of usable parts and with a significant list in Drummore harbour, near Stranraer.

References

Blackman, R.V.B. ed. Jane's Fighting Ships (1953)

 

Ham-class minesweepers
Royal Navy ship names
1955 ships